Cristina Bazgan is a French computer scientist who studies combinatorial optimization and graph theory problems from the points of view of parameterized complexity, fine-grained complexity, approximation algorithms, and regret.

Bazgan earned her Ph.D. in 1998 from the University of Paris-Sud. Her dissertation, Approximation de problèmes d'optimisation et de fonctions totales de NP, was supervised by Miklos Santha.
She is a professor at Paris Dauphine University, associated with Lamsade, the Laboratory for Analysis and Modeling Systems for Decision Support.

Bazgan became a junior member of the Institut Universitaire de France in 2011.

References

External links
Home page

French women computer scientists
Theoretical computer scientists
Academic staff of the University of Paris
Year of birth missing (living people)
Living people